Osman Ferhan Şensoy (26 February 1951 – 31 August 2021) was a Turkish actor, playwright and director.

Private life
Şensoy was born in Çarşamba district of Samsun Province in northern Turkey on 26 February 1951. After attending Galatasaray High School some time, he finished Çarşamba High School in 1970.

In 1988, he married stage and film actress Derya Baykal (born 1957). From this marriage two daughters, Müjgan Ferhan and Derya, were born. The couple divorced in 2004. He made his second marriage secretly in 2014 with stage actress Elif Durdu (born 1977), who played with Şensoy in the play “Beni Ben mi Delirttim? (literally "Did I Drive Me Crazy?") in 2003.

Career
He experienced his first professional acting with "Grup Oyuncuları" in 1971. Between 1972 and 1975, he studied Theatre in education in France and Canada. He worked under Jérôme Savary and Andre-Louis Périnetti. He was awarded the title "Best Foreigner Playwright" in Montreal, Canada in 1975 for his play Ce Fou de Gogol. He directed and played in the musical Harem qui rit at Théâtre des Quatre Sous in Montreal.

In 1975, Şensoy returned Turkey, and joined the "Nisa Serezli-Tolga Aşkıner Theatre" as an actor. He wrote several Sketch comedies for the Turkish Radio and Television Corporation and the "Cabaret Theatre Devekuşu" in 1976. He staged his cabaret Dedikodu Şov ("Gossip Show") at night club "Stardust" that was played by Adile Naşit, Perran Kutman,  Pakize Suda, Sevda Karaca and with music by İstanbul Gelişim Orchestra. At the same night club, he played in the cabaret  Kukla ve Kuklacı ("The Pupet and the Pupeteer"), written by Arda Uskan and music composed by Fuat Güner.

In 1978, his first novel Kazancı Yokuşu was published. He authored his first screenplay for the film Kızını Dövmeyen Dizini Döver (literally "He Who Doesn't Beat His Daughter Beats His Knee"). In the same year, he founded the theatre company "Anyamanya" with Mete İnselel. He directed and played in his own play İdi Amin Avantadan Lavanta.

Theatre fire
On 9 February 1987, the theatre building, in which Ferhan Şensoy staged the musical play Muzır Müzikal (literally "Mischievous Musical"), burnt down completely caused "officially" by short circuit fault. The play featured ironic criticisms of the fundamentalist segment in Turkey.

The structure next to the Surp Agop Armenian Hospital  at Elmadağ, Şişli in Istanbul was constructed mid 1950 upon the initiative of film producer Turgut Demirağ (1921–1987) and owned by the Hospital Foundation. The venue was used as a movie thaetre and a music hall for concerts in the past.

In a television show in 2001, Şensoy alleged that the fire was set by religious fanatic police officers, who were assigned to protect him.

Master of comedy
Kel Hasan Efendi (1874-1925 or 1929), a master actor of comedy in the Turkish theatre during the final years of the Ottoman era, was nicknamed "Hasan the Bald", and wore a headgear, a quilted turban, on the stage. He played a character similar to "Kavuklu" (literally "the one wearing quilted turban") of the  theatre in the round at the end of the 1800s. After retirement, he handed over his "kavuk" to İsmail Hakkı Dümbüllü (1897-1973) as a symbol of the mastery of the traditional improvisational theatre and theatre in the round. The "kavuk" was handed over to Münir Özkul (1925-2018) in 1968, a master of comedy in the cinema of Turkey. Ferhan Şensoy received the "kavuk" in 1989, and wore it 27 years long until March 2016, when he passed it over to Rasim Öztekin (1959–2021).

In the words of Münir Özkul, the "kavuk" is a symbol of 600 years of a culture, an art of performance called "tuluat" (improvisation).

Health issues and death
On 2 July 2021, Ferhan Şensoy was hospitalized due to internal bleeding. Some time ago, he had undergone an angioplasty surgery due to health problems. He was taken to hospital due to the complication that developed due following the surgery. After his treatment there, he was transferred to a private hospital for precautionary purposes.

Şensoy died in the Medical Faculty Hospital of Istanbul University on 31 August 2021. He was interred at the Zincirlikuyu Cemetery after the memorial ceremonies held at Galatasaray High School and the Theatre Ses in Beyoğlu as well as the religious service at Teşvikiye Mosque on 2 September.

Works

Plays
 Aşkımızın Son Durağı (The Last Stop of Our Love), premiered on 11 March 2006
 Kiralık Oyun (Play For Rent), premiered in 2005
 Uzun Donlu Kişot (Quixote, the Long Underpants), premiered on 31 March 2004, staged also in 2005
 Beni Ben Mi Delirttim (Have I crazed Myself), premiered on 24 October 2003
 Fişne Pahçesu (Cherry Orchard), a parody-adaptation of Anton Chekhov's play.
 Felek Bir Gün Salakken (One Day When Fate Was Foolish)
 Ferhangi Şeyler (Ferhanish Things)
 Güle Güle Godot (Bye bye Godot)
 Şahları da Vururlar (They Shoot Shahs As Well)
 İçinden Tramvay Geçen Şarkı (The Song Through Which a Streetcar Passes)

Films
 Muhalif Başkan (2013), actor
 Son Ders: Aşk ve Üniversite (2008), actor
 Pardon (2005), screenplay and actor
 Şans Kapıyı Kırınca (2004), actor
 Büyük Yalnızlık (1989), actor
 Bir Bilen (1986), actor
 Parasız Yaşamak Pahalı (1986), actor
 Köşedönücü (1985), actor
 Kızını Dövmeyen Dizini Döver (1977), actor
 Aşk Dediğin Laf Değildir (1976), actor

Television
 Varsayalım İsmail
 Boşgezen ve Kalfası

Published works
 Başkaldıran Kurşunkalem
 Seçme Sapan Şeyler
 Karagöz ile Boşverinbeni
 Elveda SSK
 Hacı Komünist
 Eşeğin Fikri
 Rum Memet
 FerhAntoloji
 Kalemimin Sapını Gülle Donattım
 Falınızda Ronesans Var
 Oteller Kitabı
 Denememeler
 İngilizce Bilmeden Hepinizi I Love You
 Güle Güle Godot
 Kahraman Bakkal Süpermarkete Karşı
 Düş Bükü
 Ayna Merdiven
 Kazancı Yokuşu
 Gündeste
 Afitap'ın kocası İstanbul
 Şahları da Vururlar

Projects
 Nuh2

References

External links
 
 Ortaoyuncular, official site of Ferhan Şensoy's theater ensemble Ortaoyuncular
 Theatre National De Strasbourg

1951 births
2021 deaths
People from Çarşamba
Galatasaray High School alumni
Turkish male stage actors
Turkish theatre directors
Turkish dramatists and playwrights
Turkish male film actors
20th-century Turkish male actors
21st-century Turkish male actors
20th-century dramatists and playwrights
21st-century dramatists and playwrights
20th-century male writers
21st-century male writers
20th-century Turkish writers
21st-century Turkish writers
Turkish male writers
Male dramatists and playwrights
Burials at Zincirlikuyu Cemetery